The Sarine or Saane is a major river of Switzerland.
It is a tributary of the Aare.

The Sarine rises in the Bernese Alps, near Sanetschhorn, in the Canton of Valais. It forms the Lac de Sénin (French) reservoir at 2034 m, and then enters the Canton of Bern, traversing the Sanetsch falls between 1900 and 1400 m. 
It then forms the westernmost valley of the Bernese Oberland, flowing past Gsteig, Gstaad and Saanen in the Obersimmental-Saanen district.
Downstream of Saanen, at 982 m, it enters the Canton of Vaud, passing Rougemont, Château-d'Œx and Rossinière, forming the Lac du Vernex at 859 m.
At 833, it traverses the Creux de l'Enfer and enters the Canton of Fribourg, forming Lac de Montbovon at 777 m.
From this point, it more or less follows the linguistic boundary between French- and German-speaking Switzerland across the bilingual canton of Fribourg (and is often identified as the geographic representation of the Röstigraben division of Switzerland).
Passing Villars-sous-Mont, Enney, Gruyères and Broc, it reaches Lac de la Gruyère at 677 m.
It then continues in serpentines towards Fribourg itself; the historical city was built in 1157 on a  peninsula of the River Sarine, protected on three sides by steep cliffs. 
Downstream of Fribourg, it widens into the Schiffenensee reservoir at 532 m (built 1963), and is then taken to Laupen in a channel, where it is joined by the Sense.

Reservoirs

References

Swisstopo: Map Saane/Sarine 1:100000,

External links
Sarine Waterlevels at Broc (682 m)
Sarine Waterlevels at Fribourg (532 m)
Saane Waterlevels at Laupen (480 m)
Saane Information at Gümmenen, Mühleberg (473 m)

Rivers of Switzerland
Bern–Fribourg border
Rivers of the canton of Bern
Rivers of Valais
Rivers of the canton of Fribourg
Rivers of the canton of Vaud